Sheykh Sar Mast (also Romanized as Shaikh Sarmast; also known as  Sheikh Sarmes) is a village in Nazluy-ye Jonubi Rural District, in the Central District of Urmia County, West Azerbaijan Province, Iran. At the 2006 census, its population was 524, in 139 families.

References 

Populated places in Urmia County